Prince Mumba may refer to:
 Prince Mumba (athlete)
 Prince Mumba (footballer)